Mōʻiliʻili, Hawaii is a neighborhood of Honolulu CDP, City and County of Honolulu, Hawaii, on the island of Oahu. Its name means “pebble lizard” in Hawaiian.

The commercial district at South King Street and University Avenue in Moiliili is the closest such district to the University of Hawaiʻi at Mānoa. The H-1 Freeway is located between University of Hawaiʻi at Mānoa and the business district.

History

The community changed from being an agriculture-centered town to an urban area in the early 20th century. 80% of Moiliili's population was of Japanese origins as of the 1930 U.S. Census. The development of the H-1 Freeway took away commercial traffic that previously patronized Moiliili's businesses.

For a 40-year period before 2007, various members of the area community considered developing Moiliili into a college town environment. Around 2002 Evan Dobelle, the president of the University of Hawaiʻi System, said that he would prioritize developing a college town. He also discussed the idea of moving the UH system offices from University of Hawaiʻi at Mānoa to Moiliili. In 2007 Kamehameha Schools bought  of land from Pacific Theatres, including the Varsity Theatre and the Varsity Office Building, increasing its landholdings in Moiliili to 11.4 acres (4.6 ha), mostly along South King Street and University Avenue.

Description
A small and local community, composed of numerous small businesses such as florists, imported goods, ethnic foods and surf gear and apparel, the major focus of the small community is  centered on the area of University Avenue and King Street, .

Located beneath the busy intersection of South King Street and University Avenue lies a complex system of caves known as the Moiliili Karst. Originally the underwater stream was fed by the Manoa stream, but it has since been rerouted. A natural pond was formed and the popular Willows restaurant  centered on this natural phenomenon. However, construction to the UH athletic fields and surrounding businesses caused collapses and rerouting of the underground waterway, and forced the owners to cement in the pond, making it now an artificial pond. Several species of fish and plant life live in this system of caves. This cave system is not open to spelunkers and is accessible only by a city sewer grate.

Mōʻiliʻili Matters
In May 2009, Mōʻiliʻili Matters, a community-based online social network, was officially launched. Among its first members were a number of community and business leaders including: Senator z, Hawaii Senate; Senator Carol Fukunaga, Hawaii Senate; Representative Scott Saiki, Hawaii House of Representatives; Representative Scott Nishimoto, Hawaii House of Representatives; Ron Lockwood, Chair of the McCully-Mōʻiliʻili Neighborhood Board; and others.

The Honolulu Weekly called it "The Might Mo': An often-overlooked neighborhood."

One of the Mōʻiliʻili neighborhood's issues has been illegal garbage dumping. Mōʻiliʻili Matters played an active role in exploring the issue and collaborating with community stakeholders. After monitoring the discussion forum on illegal garbage dumping, the Founder of Mōʻiliʻili Matters collaborated with Kamehameha Schools (Mōʻiliʻili's largest landowner) to address the problem. The collaboration produced an informational postcard regarding bulky item pick-up dates and guidelines  The postcard was mailed to more than 15,000 households.

As a result of the collaboration, Mōʻiliʻili Matters received media attention. On September 27, 2009, the Honolulu Advertiser published an article titled, "Web site aims to unite Moʻiliʻili." A few days later, June Watanabe, a Honolulu Star-Bulletin staff writer also wrote about the team effort. KHON-TV Reporter, Kirk Matthews interviewed Kamehameha Schools spokesperson Kekoa Paulsen and Mōʻiliʻili Matters Founder Derek Kauanoe for its "Be Green 2" segment titled, "Partnering to clean up city sidewalks."

After Honolulu Mayor Mufi Hannemann announced he would introduce a bill penalizing property owners for illegally dumped bulky items, the Honolulu Weekly's Ragnar Carlson once again wrote about Mōʻiliʻili Matters briefly in an Editor's note and recognized the social network for raising the illegal garbage dumping problem.

Mōʻiliʻili Matters co-hosted a Congressional candidate debate on April 13, 2010. On February 28, 2010, U.S. Representative Neil Abercrombie resigned from Congress creating an early vacancy for his seat. Although 14 candidates ran for the seat, Ed Case, Charles Djou, and Colleen Hanabusa were identified as front-runners.  Derek Kauanoe moderated the event.

Transportation
The area is serviced by Honolulu's TheBus service.

Education
Hawaii Department of Education operates public schools.

Parks and recreation
The City and County of Honolulu operates Moiliili Neighborhood Park.

The Moiliili Community Center was established around 1950 and originated from the Moiliili Japanese Language School, a Japanese-language school established by Kihachi and Shika Kashiwabara in 1906. At its pre-World War II peak this Japanese school had over 1,000 students. Non-Japanese persons transferred board positions to non-Japanese and had a Boy Scout troop moved into one of the school's buildings to prevent the school from being confiscated during the war. The Moiliili Community Association received the school's lands and assets in 1945, leading to the establishment of the community center. In 1996 the community center had programs for 660 children and about 600 adults of all ages.

See also

Marco Polo condo fire

References

External links
Mōʻiliʻili Community Center: http://www.moiliilicc.org/
Mōʻiliʻili Matters (Resident Social Networking Site): http://www.moiliilimatters.com

Japanese-American culture in Honolulu
Neighborhoods in Honolulu